Scrobipalpa nigrigrisea is a moth in the family Gelechiidae. It was described by Oleksiy V. Bidzilya and Hou-Hun Li in 2010. It is found in Tibet.

Etymology
The species name refers to the blackish-grey forewings and is derived from the Latin prefix nigr- (meaning black) and Latin griseus (meaning grey).

References

Scrobipalpa
Moths described in 2010